The women's scratch race at the UEC European Track Championships was first competed in 2014 in Guadeloupe, France.

The scratch race consists of a single race over a certain length. The winner is the first to cross the line, taking into cyclists who have lapped the peloton.

Medalists

References

 
Women's scratch
Women's scratch